Semnocera is a genus of moths in the family Gracillariidae.

Species
Semnocera procellaris (Meyrick, 1914)

External links
Global Taxonomic Database of Gracillariidae (Lepidoptera)

Gracillariinae
Gracillarioidea genera